Harper Woods School District is a school district headquartered in Harper Woods, Michigan, United States in Metro Detroit.

History
In 2003 the district twice attempted to pass a $42 million bond that called for replacing all three school buildings. Both attempts failed, with the first failing by 25 votes and the second failing by 700 votes. If either attempted passed, each Harper Woods School District taxpayer would have had to pay an extra amount over $260 per year for 30 years. Daniel Danosky, the superintendent, said that if the district decided to renovate, the cost would be about $32 million. He argued that it would make more sense to instead build new and pay $42 million.

As of March 2004, of the 3,600 households within the school district, less than 25% had school-aged children. Not all of them were enrolled in the public school system. As a result, the residents of the Harper Woods School District had a reluctance to pass school bonds.

In 2013 board members considered the possibility of a school uniform policy.  all schools now have uniform policies.

Schools
 Harper Woods High School #2
 Triumph Middle School
The middle school was moved from being a wing of the high school to a new building in 2018, formerly owned by Triumph Church, which is still connected to the school today.
 Beacon Elementary School
Beacon Elementary is located at 19475 Beaconsfield. The principal is Jan Gottsleban.  The building is boarded by three little league baseball field used mostly by the teams of the Harper Woods Little League. 
 Tyrone Elementary School

Defunct schools
 Harper Woods High School #1 - The original, combined middle-high school building was razed and replaced in the mid-2000s by the new secondary school building above.

References

External links

 Harper Woods School District

School districts in Michigan
Education in Wayne County, Michigan